John Barton Davis (July 13, 1883 – October 7, 1946) was a Negro leagues pitcher for several years before the founding of the first Negro National League.

A 1907 St. Paul newspaper paper noted that Davis and fellow St. Paul Colored Gophers pitcher Clarence Lytle both had No-hitter games to their credit.

During World War I, when Davis registered for selective service and the draft, he listed he was working for International Harvester as a "dirt shaper" operator (which may have been a road grader). It also listed that he was married to Lizzie Davis.

Davis died in St. Paul, Minnesota in 1946 at the age of 63.

References

External links

Algona Brownies players
Chicago Giants players
Columbia Giants players
Cuban Stars (West) players
French Lick Plutos players
Leland Giants players
Philadelphia Giants players
St. Paul Colored Gophers players
1883 births
1946 deaths
20th-century African-American people